A tornado watch (SAME code: TOA) is a severe weather watch product of the National Weather Service that is issued by national weather forecasting agencies when meteorological conditions are favorable for the development of severe thunderstorms capable of producing tornadoes. In addition to the potential for tornado development, thunderstorms that develop within the watch area may contain large hail, straight-line winds, intense rainfall and/or flooding that pose a similar damage risk as the attendant tornado threat. A tornado watch does not mean a tornado is active or will appear, just that favorable conditions increases the likelihood of such happening. A watch must not be confused with a tornado warning.

Definition
A tornado watch indicates that atmospheric conditions observed in and close to the watch area have created a significant risk for the development and intensification of severe convective thunderstorms capable of producing tornadoes, and are normally issued in advance of the onset of severe weather. If severe weather actually does occur, a severe thunderstorm warning or tornado warning would then be issued. Residents and travelers in the watch area are advised to immediately undertake safety preparations ahead of the arrival of severe weather. A tornado watch is not required for a warning to be issued; tornado warnings are occasionally issued when a tornado watch is not active (i.e., when a severe thunderstorm watch is active or if conditions for tornadic development are not expected to be substantive enough to require a watch), if a severe thunderstorm has a confirmed tornado or developed strong rotation. A tornado watch can replace an existing severe thunderstorm watch, if not merely a portion of it, if conditions that were originally considered marginally conducive if at all for tornadic development have evolved to permit a greater risk of tornado formation.

Although the risk of tornadoes is emphasized as the primary hazard, depending on storm cell intensity, the probability exists for other hazardous phenomena exceeding regional severe criterion to occur: severe thunderstorms that develop within the watch area will also pose a likelihood of producing large hailstones, intense straight-line winds that can produce serious structural damage equivalent to a lower-category tornado over a comparatively broader areal swath, intense lightning, torrential rainfall and/or flash flooding caused by high rainfall accumulations. A tornado watch therefore implies that it is also a severe thunderstorm watch.

When a tornado watch is issued, people within the region of expected tornado threat are advised to review safety precautions in the event they must seek immediate shelter in a basement, cellar, safe room or a sturdy above-ground room in the center section of a home or building (such as a bathroom or closet) when a tornado warning or severe thunderstorm warning is issued for their area. Residents are also advised to monitor conditions ahead of the developing weather situation, and keep abreast of warnings and updated storm information through local broadcast media, weather radio, weather app alert notifications, SMS notifications and/or automated emergency phone calls. Where present, tornado sirens and local police or fire department dispatch units are also used as an outdoor warning system in the event of a tornado or particularly intense non-tornadic thunderstorm in some tornado-prone regions.

Regional basis

United States
In the United States, tornado watches are issued by the Storm Prediction Center (SPC), a national guidance center of the National Weather Service (NWS), for areas of the lower 48 states where atmospheric conditions favor the development of tornadoes and accompanying severe thunderstorms. Although watch issuances for those states is exceedingly rare, responsibilities for issuing tornado watches covering Alaska and Hawaii are respectively handled by local NWS forecast offices in Fairbanks, Anchorage and Juneau, Alaska, and Honolulu, Hawaii. Watches are typically are valid for six to nine hours (extending if necessary as long as 12 hours during tropical cyclones or other unusually steady-state or slow-moving severe weather events) after the time of issuance, and are intended to precede the first reported tornado by two hours and the first report of severe hail or wind by one hour. SPC watch boxes—termed because the approximate watch area is represented as a quadrilateral for aviation purposes—are usually outlined in the approximate delineation of x miles north and south, or east and west, or either side of a line (perpendicular to the center line) from y miles direction of city, state, to z miles another direction of another city, state (e.g., "50 miles either side of a line from 10 miles northeast of Columbia, South Carolina to 15 miles south-southwest of Montgomery, Alabama").

In situations which the SPC has outlined a “high risk” or high-end “moderate risk” of severe convective storms within and near the watch area, the intensified wording "particularly dangerous situation" (PDS) can be added into the watch product to highlight high forecaster confidence that atmospheric conditions support the development of multiple strong to violent tornadoes (rated EF2–EF5 on the Enhanced Fujita Scale) capable of significant damage if not total destruction of property and severe injury or death from the intense winds and projectile debris, as well as the possibility of destructive straight-line winds and hail from the parent supercells. (Tornadoes occurring in these situations may develop during the storm's maturation stage under typical low-level mesocyclonic tornadogenesis, or by accelerated mesocyclonic maturation generated early in the thunderstorm's development from sufficient wind shear and very high convective available potential energy [CAPE] values.) PDS tornado watches—which, based on SPC watch issuance averages between 1996 and 2005, account for ~3% of all tornado watches issued per year in the U.S.—usually suggest the likelihood of a major tornado outbreak, although they can be issued if a significant threat exists of isolated intense tornadoes. The SPC (then the National Severe Storms Forecast Center) conceived the PDS verbiage for use in tornado watches in 1981; the SPC and the National Weather Service have since been applied it to other watches and warnings (including tornado warnings, severe thunderstorm watches and warnings, flash flood warnings and red flag warnings) to emphasize an exceptionally high risk to life and property.

SPC meteorologists utilize WarnGen software integrated into the National Centers Advance Weather Interactive Processing System (N-AWIPS) and/or the SPC Product Generator (PRODGEN) to generate the watch statement, which is disseminated through various communication routes accessed by the media and various agencies, on the internet, to NOAA satellites, and over NOAA Weather Radio. The term "red box" refers to the coloring assigned to tornado watch boxes for hazard maps used by the Storm Prediction Center and the National Weather Service; severe weather alert displays used by many local television stations typically assign other colors (most commonly, green, yellow or purple) to highlight tornado watches. (Red, which television alert displays usually reserve as an identifier for tornado warnings, is seldom if ever used to highlight tornado watches.)

The Storm Prediction Center, in conjunction with local NWS Weather Forecast Offices, issues component watch products to communicate the approximate area, primary hazards and other pertinent information about the tornado watch to the public, NOAA meteorologists, emergency management and aviation personnel. The graphical and text Public Watch products—in addition to outlining the approximate affected area, valid time, meteorological and aviation discussions, and other pertinent information—includes language specifying the forecast tornado threat (e.g., "several tornadoes and a few intense tornadoes likely") in the primary hazards list. The Watch Probability Table describes probabilities for all modes of severe weather, including probabilities of two or more tornadoes and one or more strong to violent tornadoes. (Typically, the minimum tornado probabilities for a tornado watch issuance require a ~40% chance of two or more tornado reports and, for PDS watches, an 70% chance of one or more strong tornadoes within the watch area over the valid time period.)

The SPC produces two separate products listing all counties or equivalent subdivisions (parishes, independent cities, and coastal marine zones) included in the broader watch area: Watch County Lists (WCL), which are produced internally preceding the watch issuance for collaborative use with local NWS offices to outline counties and equivalent subdivisions being proposed for inclusion in the watch, and Watch Outline Update (WOU) messages, a public list of the determined watch subdivisions published upon the initial tornado watch issuance. Local NWS offices concurrently issue Watch County Notification (WCN) messages that list subdivisions within their designated area of responsibility that the office has considered to be in the initial watch; WCN messages—which the SPC uses as the basis for their Watch Outline Update product—are updated to denote changes to the watch by local WFOs, which are provided responsibility for adding or removing counties/subdivisions from the watch, extending its time of expiration, or cancelling the watch entirely if conditions no longer support a severe weather threat (if atmospheric conditions have become less conducive to form tornadoes or were insufficient for tornadic development compared to earlier forecast analysis). The SPC updates Watch Outline Updates at least on an hourly basis to incorporate changes made by the accordant WFOs in their Watch County Notification messages.

The SPC issues Watch Status Messages to designate areas considered to have a continuing severe weather threat, based primarily on the position of surface features (such as cold fronts and drylines)—and the NWS offices decide what counties to remove from the watch (the local offices will almost always follow the SPC recommendation on the status messages). If conditions are no longer favorable for tornadoes in the watch area, a tornado watch may either be replaced by a severe thunderstorm watch or cancelled outright; likewise, a tornado watch may replace a severe thunderstorm watch, if not merely a section of it, should conditions that were originally forecast to be conducive for non-tornadic severe thunderstorms evolve to allow an increased possibility of tornado formation. If no convective development or tornadic activity occurs, this leads to a tornado watch "bust", which can factor into determinations by the SPC and National Weather Service offices on whether to cancel the watch.

Because the Storm Prediction Center and local National Weather Service WFOs each have roles in the watch issuance process, the subdivisions listed in the Watch Outline Update and Watch County Notification products will sometimes differ from the outlined watch box area, including subdivisions located outside the outlined quadrilateral; however the local Weather Forecast Office is tasked with determining which counties should be included in or, in lieu of a new downstream watch, added to the designated watch area. The WFOs monitoring their sector of the watch area can also consult, via conference call, with the Storm Prediction Center to relay and determine locally dictated changes to the tornado watch, regarding replacement of the watch and extensions of time and areal coverage if conditions warrant.

Canada
In Canada, Environment and Climate Change Canada issues tornado watches through regional Meteorological Service offices based in Vancouver, Edmonton, Winnipeg, Toronto, Montreal and Dartmouth. Unlike the box/subdivision structure of watches issued by the U.S. Storm Prediction Center, tornado watches issued by the Meteorological Service are issued strictly for groups of census subdivisions, often covering a total area that is relatively smaller than tornado watches in the U.S.). Watches are disseminated to the public through broadcast and online media outlets (including local television stations and The Weather Network/MétéoMédia), and Weatheradio Canada; depending on regional office discretion, the watch may require activation of the National Public Alerting System (Alert Ready) and feeding provincial alerting systems (such as Alberta Emergency Alert and SaskAlert) to distribute the alert to local broadcast media and cellular phones.

Example products

Example of a tornado watch

   URGENT - IMMEDIATE BROADCAST REQUESTED
   Tornado Watch Number 119
   NWS Storm Prediction Center Norman OK
   1130 AM EDT Mon Apr 13 2020

   The National weather service has issued 

   * Tornado Watch #119 for portions of 
     District Of Columbia
     Delaware
     Maryland
     New Jersey
     Central and eastern Pennsylvania
     Northern Virginia
     Eastern West Virginia Panhandle
     Coastal Waters

   * Effective this Monday morning and evening from 1130 AM until
     600 PM EDT.

   * Primary threats include...
     A couple tornadoes possible
     Scattered damaging wind gusts to 70 mph likely
     Isolated large hail events to 1.5 inches in diameter possible

   SUMMARY...Clusters of strong to severe thunderstorms will likely
   develop rapidly northeast across the Mid-Atlantic region this
   afternoon. Scattered damaging winds are likely and a couple tornadic
   storms will be possible.

   The tornado watch area is approximately along and 100 statute miles
   east and west of a line from 55 miles northwest of Allentown PA to
   35 miles south southeast of Washington DC. For a complete depiction
   of the watch see the associated watch outline update (WOUS64 KWNS
   WOU9).

   PRECAUTIONARY/PREPAREDNESS ACTIONS...

   REMEMBER...A Tornado Watch means conditions are favorable for
   development of severe weather, including TORNADOS, LARGE HAIL AND DAMAGING WINDS, in and close to the watch
   area. Persons should be on the lookout for
  rapidly changing weather conditions and listen for later statements
   and possible warnings.

   &&

   OTHER WATCH INFORMATION...CONTINUE...WW 118...

   AVIATION...Tornadoes and a few severe thunderstorms with hail
   surface and aloft to 1.5 inches. Extreme turbulence and surface wind
   gusts to 60 knots. A few cumulonimbi with maximum tops to 400. Mean
   storm motion vector 23045.

   ...Grams

Example of a Watch Outline Update
Below is another example issued by the National Weather Service in Norman, Oklahoma.

   BULLETIN – IMMEDIATE BROADCAST REQUESTED
   TORNADO WATCH OUTLINE UPDATE FOR WT 68
   NWS STORM PREDICTION CENTER NORMAN OK
   825 AM EDT THU MAR 26 2009
   
   TORNADO WATCH 68 IS IN EFFECT UNTIL 200 PM EDT FOR THE
    FOLLOWING LOCATIONS
   
   ALC031-045-061-067-069-261800-
   /O.NEW.KWNS.TO.A.0068.090326T1225Z-090326T1800Z/
   
   AL 
   .    ALABAMA COUNTIES INCLUDED ARE
   
   COFFEE               DALE                GENEVA              
   HENRY                HOUSTON             
   
   
   FLC005-013-045-059-063-131-133-261800-
   /O.NEW.KWNS.TO.A.0068.090326T1225Z-090326T1800Z/
   
   FL 
   .    FLORIDA COUNTIES INCLUDED ARE
   
   BAY                  CALHOUN             GULF                
   HOLMES               JACKSON             WALTON              
   WASHINGTON           
   
   
   GAC035-037-053-061-063-077-079-099-113-145-149-151-171-197-199-
   201-207-215-231-239-243-249-253-255-259-261-263-269-273-285-293-
   307-261800-
   /O.NEW.KWNS.TO.A.0068.090326T1225Z-090326T1800Z/
   
   GA 
   .    GEORGIA COUNTIES INCLUDED ARE
   
   BUTTS                CALHOUN             CHATTAHOOCHEE       
   CLAY                 CLAYTON             COWETA              
   CRAWFORD             EARLY               FAYETTE             
   HARRIS               HEARD               HENRY               
   LAMAR                MARION              MERIWETHER          
   MILLER               MONROE              MUSCOGEE            
   PIKE                 QUITMAN             RANDOLPH            
   SCHLEY               SEMINOLE            SPALDING            
   STEWART              SUMTER              TALBOT              
   TAYLOR               TERRELL             TROUP               
   UPSON                WEBSTER             
   
   
   GMZ750-261800-
   /O.NEW.KWNS.TO.A.0068.090326T1225Z-090326T1800Z/
   
   CW 
   
   .    ADJACENT COASTAL WATERS INCLUDED ARE
   
   COASTAL WATERS FROM APALACHICOLA TO DESTIN FL OUT 20 NM 
   
   ATTN...WFO...TAE...FFC...

Example of a Watch Status Message

STATUS REPORT #1 ON WW 68

VALID 261425Z - 261540Z

SEVERE WEATHER THREAT CONTINUES RIGHT OF A LINE FROM 20 ESE PNS
TO 30 N DHN TO 15 E ATL.

..SPC..03/26/09

ATTN...WFO...TAE...FFC...

See also
 Severe weather terminology (United States)

References

External links
Current Watches

Weather warnings and advisories
Tornado